Sengoku (written: 仙石, 千石 or 仙谷) is a Japanese surname. Notable people with the surname include:

Hiroko Sengoku (仙石), Japanese manga artist
Masakata Sengoku (仙石, 11843-1917), Japanese head of the Izushi Domain
Noriko Sengoku (千石, 1922–2012), Japanese actress 
Ren Sengoku (仙石), Japanese footballer
Sengoku Hidehisa (仙石), Japanese samurai 
Yoshito Sengoku (仙谷), Japanese politician 

Japanese-language surnames